Stranger in Paradise is an album by jazz guitarist Peter Bernstein.

Background
Bernstein and pianist Brad Mehldau had recorded together several times previously, and bassist Larry Grenadier and drummer Bill Stewart had played with the guitarist on his Heart's Content album.

Music and recording
Three of the tracks are Bernstein originals. The album contains "elements of hard bop and post-bop, including an intriguing, slightly off-center approach to 'Stranger in Paradise' and an intricate, moving interpretation of 'This Is Always'". Also covered are "a greasy arranging of Babs Gonzales' 'Soul Stirrin' ' and a breezy take of 'That Sunday, That Summer'".

Reception
The Penguin Guide to Jazz commented that this and Bernstein's previous album, Heart's Content, "work at every level".

Track listing
"Venus Blues" (Bernstein)
"Stranger in Paradise" (Alexander Borodin, George Forrest, Robert Wright)
"Luiza" (Antônio Carlos Jobim)
"How Little We Know" (Springer)
"Bobblehead" (Bernstein)
"Just a Thought" (Bernstein)
"This Is Always" (Harry Warren)
"Soul Stirrin'" (Babs Gonzales)
"That Sunday, That Summer"  (Joe Sherman, George David Weiss)
"Autumn Nocturne" (Josef Myrow)

Personnel
 Peter Bernstein – guitar
 Brad Mehldau – piano
 Larry Grenadier – bass
 Bill Stewart – drums

References

2004 albums
Peter Bernstein albums